Andrea Armellini (born 2 July 1970) is a retired Italian football goalkeeper.

In the first leg of the 1994 Coppa Italia Final, Armellini kept a clean sheet for Ancona.

References

1970 births
Living people
Italian footballers
Civitanovese Calcio players
Alma Juventus Fano 1906 players
A.C. Ancona players
A.C.N. Siena 1904 players
Benevento Calcio players
A.C. Cesena players
Modena F.C. players
U.S. Avellino 1912 players
Giulianova Calcio players
S.S. Juve Stabia players
A.S.D. Progreditur Marcianise players
Association football goalkeepers
People from Sant'Elpidio a Mare